Dave O'Brien (born David Poole Fronabarger, May 31, 1912 – November 8, 1969) was an American film actor, director, and writer.

Life and career 
Born in Big Spring, Texas, O'Brien started his film career performing in choruses and working as a stunt double before gradually winning larger roles, mostly in B pictures.

O'Brien was best known to movie audiences in the 1940s as the hero of the famous Metro-Goldwyn-Mayer comedy short film series Pete Smith Specialties narrated by Pete Smith. O'Brien wrote and directed many of these subjects under the name David Barclay. O'Brien also had a small dancing part with Bebe Daniels in the Busby Berkeley musical 42nd Street (1933).

He appeared in the first few of Monogram Pictures East Side Kids films, then appeared in many low-budget Westerns, such as Producers Releasing Corporation's Texas Rangers series, where he was often billed as "Tex" O'Brien, alluding to his home state.

He appeared in Queen of the Yukon (1940) as Bob Adams.  In 1940, he appeared in The Devil Bat as part of a comedy team with Donald Kerr.  They also appeared together in Son of the Navy (1940) and The Man Who Walked Alone (1945).

In 1942, O'Brien starred in the movie serial Captain Midnight, and had the lead role in the Western Brand of the Devil in 1944.

One of his later roles was in the MGM musical version of Kiss Me, Kate (1953), a rare featured role for the actor in an 'A' list big-budget production.

To modern audiences, he is most likely best to be remembered as a frantic dope addict in the 1936 low-budget exploitation film Tell Your Children (better known under its reissue title, Reefer Madness), yelling "Play it faster, play it faster!" to a piano-playing girl (Lillian Miles).

O'Brien married one of his co-stars of Reefer Madness, Dorothy Short, in 1936, but they divorced in 1954 after having two children. In 1955, he married Nancy O'Brien and had three more children. A keen yachtsman, he died aged 57 of a heart attack aboard a 60-foot sloop named The White Cloud while competing in a yachting race off the California coast near Catalina Island. He apparently had been experiencing symptoms of cardiac problems for several weeks, but did not seek medical attention.

Recognition
As a writer for The Red Skelton Show, O'Brien shared an Emmy Award for Outstanding Writing for a Comedy Series in 1961 and shared a nomination for the same award in 1963.

Selected filmography

 Consolation Marriage (1931)
 The World Changes (1933) as Otto Peterson (uncredited)
 Bright Eyes (1934) as Bill
 Reefer Madness (1936)
 Rough Riding Rhythm (1937)
 Frontier Scout (1938) as Steven Norris
 Fighting Mad (1939) as Constable Kelly
 Flaming Lead (1939)
 Crashing Thru (1939)
 Main Street Lawyer (1939) (uncredited)
 East Side Kids (1940) as 'Knuckles' Dolan
 Boys of the City (1940) as 'Knuckles' Dolan
 That Gang of Mine (1940) as 'Knuckles' Dolan
 Gun Code (1940) as Gale
 The Devil Bat (1940) as Johnny Layton
 Isle of Destiny (1940) Navy Radio Man (uncredited)
 Phantom Rancher (1940) as Henchman Luke
 Son of the Navy (1940) as Chief Machinist's Mate
 Hold That Woman (1940) as Miles Hanover
 Sky Bandits (1940) as Constable Kelly 
 Buzzy Rides the Range (1940) as Ken Blair
 Flying Wild (1941) as Tom Lawson
 Buzzy and the Phantom Pinto (1941)
 The Spider Returns (1941)
 Murder by Invitation (1941) as Michael, the Chauffeur
 Billy the Kid in Santa Fe (1941) as Texas Joe
 Billy the Kid Wanted (1941) as Jeff
 Spooks Run Wild (1941) as Jeff Dixon
 Double Trouble (1941) as Sparky Marshall
 Forbidden Trails (1941) as Jim Cramer
 Bowery at Midnight (1942) as Peter Crawford
 'Neath Brooklyn Bridge (1942) as Sergeant Lyons
 Billy the Kid's Smoking Guns (1942) as Jeff Travis
 The Yanks Are Coming (1942) as Sgt. Callahan
 The Rangers Take Over (1942) as Tex Wyatt
 Bad Men of Thunder Gap (1943) as Tex Wyatt
 West of Texas (1943) as Tex Wyatt
 Border Buckaroos (1943) as Tex Wyatt
 Fighting Valley (1943) as Tex Wyatt
 Trail of Terror (1943) as Tex Wyatt
 The Return of the Rangers (1943) as Tex Wyatt
 Boss of Rawhide (1943) as Tex Wyatt
 Tahiti Nights (1944)
 Outlaw Roundup (1944) as Tex Wyatt
 Guns of the Law (1944) as Tex Wyatt
 The Pinto Bandit (1944) as Tex Wyatt
 Spook Town (1944) as Tex Wyatt
 Brand of the Devil (1944) as Tex Wyatt
 Gunsmoke Mesa (1944) as Tex Wyatt
 Gangsters of the Frontier (1944) as Tex Wyatt
 Dead or Alive (1944) as Tex Wyatt
 The Whispering Skull (1944) as Tex Wyatt
 Marked for Murder (1945) as Tex Wyatt
 Enemy of the Law (1945) as Tex Wyatt
 Three in the Saddle (1945) as Tex Wyatt
 Frontier Fugitives (1945) as Tex Wyatt
 Flaming Bullets (1945) as Tex Wyatt
 The Man Who Walked Alone (1945)
 Kiss Me, Kate (1953)
 The Kettles in the Ozarks (1956) Conductor

Selected short subjects

References

External links

 

1912 births
1969 deaths
American male film actors
People from Big Spring, Texas
20th-century American male actors
Film directors from Texas
 People who died at sea